Daniel O'Connell (1775–1847) was an Irish nationalist leader.

Daniel O'Connell may also refer to:
Daniel O'Connell (journalist) (1849–1899), San Francisco literary figure, grand nephew of Daniel O'Connell of Ireland
Daniel P. O'Connell (1885–1977), American politician
Daniel O'Connell Jnr (1816–1897), Member of Parliament, son of Daniel O'Connell of Ireland
Daniel Charles O'Connell (1745–1833), Irish army officer and uncle of Daniel O'Connell
D. P. O'Connell (Daniel Patrick O'Connell;1924–1979), barrister and academic specializing in international law
Danny O'Connell (1927–1969), baseball player
Dan O'Connell (director) (born 1950s), pornographic film director